David Turquand-Young (13 January 1904 – 14 September 1984) was a British modern pentathlete. He competed at the 1924 and 1928 Summer Olympics. He was member of England national rugby union team in 1928 and 1929.

References

External links
 

1904 births
1984 deaths
British male modern pentathletes
Olympic modern pentathletes of Great Britain
Modern pentathletes at the 1924 Summer Olympics
Modern pentathletes at the 1928 Summer Olympics
Athletes from London
England international rugby union players
Rugby union players from London